Pseudocoremia fenerata is a moth of the family Geometridae. It is endemic to New Zealand.

The wingspan is 27–34 mm.

Recorded food plants of the larvae include Agathis australis, Dacrydium bidwillii, Dacrydium biforme, Dacrydium cupressinum, Phyllocladus alpinus, Phyllocladus trichomanoides, Podocarpus ferrugineus and Podocarpus totara. Exotic hosts are Chamaecyparis lawsoniana, Cryptomeria japonica, Larix decidua, Larix kempferi and Pinus species.

References

External links

Info on Larval Stage

Boarmiini
Moths of New Zealand
Moths described in 1875
Endemic fauna of New Zealand
Taxa named by Rudolf Felder
Endemic moths of New Zealand